The rusty sparrow (Aimophila rufescens) is a species of bird in the family Passerellidae that is found in Belize, Costa Rica, El Salvador, Guatemala, Honduras, Mexico and Nicaragua. Its natural habitats are subtropical or tropical dry forest, subtropical or tropical moist montane forest, and subtropical or tropical high-altitude shrubland.

References

rusty sparrow
rusty sparrow
Birds of Central America
Birds of Mexico
Birds of Belize
Birds of El Salvador
Birds of Guatemala
Birds of Honduras
Birds of Nicaragua
rusty sparrow
Taxonomy articles created by Polbot